Horst may refer to:

Science
 Horst (geology), a raised fault block bounded by normal faults or graben

People
 Horst (given name)
 Horst (surname)
 ter Horst, Dutch surname
 van der Horst, Dutch surname

Places

Settlements

Germany
 Horst, Steinburg, a municipality in the district of Steinburg in Schleswig-Holstein
 Horst, Lauenburg, a municipality in the district of Lauenburg in Schleswig-Holstein
 Horst, Mecklenburg-Vorpommern, a village and district in the municipality of Sundhagen, Mecklenburg-Vorpommern
 , a district in the city of Gelsenkirchen, North Rhine-Westphalia
 , a town in the municipality of Seevetal, Lower Saxony

Netherlands
 Horst aan de Maas, a municipality in the province of Limburg
 Horst, Limburg, the municipal seat of Horst aan de Maas
 , a hamlet in the municipality of Ermelo, Gelderland
 , a village in the municipality of Gilze en Rijen, North Brabant

Poland
 Niechorze, German name for a village in West Pomeranian Voivodeship, north-western Poland

Buildings
 , a castle in the Belgian municipality of Holsbeek, Flemish Brabant
 , a former castle in the Dutch municipality of Achterberg, Utrecht
 , a partially rebuild castle ruin in the Dutch municipality of Horst aan de Maas
 Adlerhorst, a former bunker complex in the German state of Hesse

Geographic features
 Horst (Spessart), a hill in Hesse, Germany
 Horst (Vogelsberg), a hill in Hesse, Germany

Sport
 STV Horst-Emscher, a defunct German association football club

Fictional characters
 Horst (Inheritance), a character in the novel Eragon
 Horst Staley, a MacArthur midshipman in the Larry Niven and Jerry Pournelle science fiction novel The Mote in God's Eye
 Dr. Horst, a character in the 2002 film Wilbur Wants to Kill Himself played by Mads Mikkelsen
 Horst, a character in the 2007 film Ratatouille played by Will Arnett
 Horst Cabal, the main character's elder brother from Jonathan L. Howard's Johannes Cabal series
 Horst Loeffler, the main character's almost ex-husband from the 2013 postmodern detective novel Bleeding Edge by Thomas Pynchon